Kim Hee-jeong may refer to:

 Kim Hee-jung (actress, born 1970) (born 1970), South Korean actress
 Kim Hee-jung (actress, born 1992) (born 1992), South Korean actress
 Kim Hee-jeong (fencer) (born 1975), South Korean fencer